David Morales Paz (born 10 February 1977) is a Spanish rower. He competed in the men's lightweight coxless four event at the 1996 Summer Olympics.

References

External links
 

1977 births
Living people
Spanish male rowers
Olympic rowers of Spain
Rowers at the 1996 Summer Olympics
People from Tortosa
Sportspeople from the Province of Tarragona